Monster movie is a film genre.

Monster Movie may also refer to:

 Monster Movie (band), a dream pop band
 Monster Movie (Can album), 1969
 Monster Movie (The Rainmakers album), 2014
 Monster Movie (film), a 2008 horror comedy film

See also
Films named Monster (disambiguation)